Accused of Murder is a 1956 American Trucolor film noir crime film directed by Joseph Kane and starring David Brian, Vera Ralston and Sidney Blackmer.

Plot
Nightclub singer Ilona Vance is accused of murder because she was the last person to see crooked attorney Frank Hobart alive. Lt. Hargis attempts to prove her innocence.

Cast
 David Brian as Lt. Roy Hargis
 Vera Ralston as Ilona Vance
 Sidney Blackmer as Frank Hobart
 Virginia Grey as Sandra Lamoreaux
 Warren Stevens as Stant
 Lee Van Cleef as Sgt. Emmett Lackey
 Barry Kelley as Police Captain Smedley
 Richard Karlan as Chad Bayliss
 Frank Puglia as Cesar Cipriano
 Elisha Cook Jr. as Whitey Pollock
 Ian MacDonald as Trumble
 Greta Thyssen as  Myra Bayliss

See also
List of American films of 1956

References

External links
 
 
 

1956 films
1950s crime thriller films
American crime thriller films
Color film noir
American police detective films
Film noir
Films based on American novels
Films based on crime novels
Films based on works by W. R. Burnett
Republic Pictures films
Trucolor films
Films directed by Joseph Kane
1950s English-language films
1950s American films